Xhemil Dino (1894–1972) was an Albanian politician and diplomat.

He was born in Preveza in the Janina Vilayet of the Ottoman Empire on 21 December 1894 to a branch of the notable Dino family of the area. He studied in Galatasaray High School and after the declaration of independence of Albania he was elected deputy of Dibër. He was a delegate from Albania to the Sixth, Seventh and Eighth Assembly of the League of Nations (1925–1927). He became ambassador of Albania to the United Kingdom in 1932.

During the era of the monarchy King Zog appointed him Minister of Foreign Affairs. During the Italian occupation of Albania Xhemil Dino was given the rank of an ambassador in the Italian service. After occupied by the Axis forces (1941–1944), Xhemil Dino was appointed the High Commissioner of Thesprotia (Cameria) and actively collaborated with the Italian and German forces. He fled Albania end of 1944. He finally went to exile in Franco's Spain in 1945. He died on 2 July 1972 in Madrid and was buried in Rome.

References

1894 births
1972 deaths
People from Preveza
People from Janina vilayet
Cham Albanians
Government ministers of Albania
Foreign ministers of Albania
Ambassadors of Albania to the United Kingdom
Albanian collaborators with Nazi Germany
Albanian collaborators with Fascist Italy
Albanian anti-communists
Members of the Parliament of Albania
Permanent Representatives of Albania to the League of Nations
Xhemil
Galatasaray High School alumni
Burials in Rome by place